Janaka Bandara Tennakoon is a Sri Lankan politician, a member of the Parliament of Sri Lanka and a former Cabinet Minister. He was educated at Dharmaraja College, Kandy. He contested as the Group Leader of the Matale District of the Central Province and was elected to the Provincial Council with a majority of Proportional Votes in 1993; Elected as a Member of Parliament with a majority of proportional votes in the General Election of 1994; Elected as a Member of Parliament from the District of Matale with the majority of proportional votes in the general election of 2000. He also previously served as the Minister of Lands and Land Development and Minister of Public Services, Provincial Councils and Local Government.

He is involved in several committees formed by the government.

Career 
Started his career as a Sub Inspector of Police in 1973,

Elected as a Central Province Council Member in 1993,

Education 
Completed his primary and secondary education at Dharmaraja College.

Holder of Diploma in Business Management, Mass Communication and Information Technology,

.

See also
 List of political families in Sri Lanka

Notes

References
 

Alumni of Dharmaraja College
Living people
Members of the 10th Parliament of Sri Lanka
Members of the 11th Parliament of Sri Lanka
Members of the 12th Parliament of Sri Lanka
Members of the 13th Parliament of Sri Lanka
Members of the 14th Parliament of Sri Lanka
Members of the 15th Parliament of Sri Lanka
Members of the 16th Parliament of Sri Lanka
Sri Lanka Podujana Peramuna politicians
Government ministers of Sri Lanka
Sri Lanka Freedom Party politicians
United People's Freedom Alliance politicians
1953 births
Local government and provincial councils ministers of Sri Lanka